Corydiidae, previously known as Polyphagidae, is a family of the order Blattodea (cockroaches). Many are known as sand cockroaches. The family is divided into five subfamilies, comprising some 40 genera. One prominent species is the desert cockroach, Arenivaga investigata.

Genera

Corydiinae
 Anosigamia
 Arenivaga
 Austropolyphaga
 Eremoblatta
 Ergaula
 Eucorydia
 Eupolyphaga
 Hemelytroblatta
 Heterogamisca
 Heterogamodes
 Homoeogamia
 Hypercompsa
 Leiopteroblatta
 Mononychoblatta
 Nymphrytria
 Polyphaga
 Polyphagina
 Polyphagoides
 Therea

Latindiinae
 Buboblatta
 Bucolion
 Compsodes
 Gapudipentax
 Latindia
 Melestora
 Myrmecoblatta
 Paralatindia
 Sinolatindia
 Stenoblatta

Other
 Aclavoidea
 Anacompsa
 Ctenoneura
 Euthyrrhapha (Euthyrrhaphinae)
 Holocompsa (Holocompsinae)
 Homopteroidea
 Ipisoma
 Ipolatta
 Melyroidea
 Oulopteryx
 Pholadoblatta
 Sphecophila (Tiviinae)
 Tivia (Tiviinae)
 Zetha
Extinct genera
†Bimodala Šmídová, 2019 Burmese amber, Myanmar, Cenomanian
†Cretaholocompsa Martínez-Delclòs, 1993 la Pedrera de Rubies Formation, Spain, Barremian
†Fragosublatta Chen et al., 2021 Burmese amber, Myanmar, Cenomanian
†Magniocula Qiu et al., 2019 Burmese amber, Myanmar, Cenomanian
†Nodosigalea Li & Huang, 2018 Burmese amber, Myanmar, Cenomanian
†Spinka Vršanský et al., 2019 Burmese amber, Myanmar, Cenomanian

References

Cockroach families